The 1977–78 European Cup Winners' Cup was won by Anderlecht in the final against Austria Wien. It was Anderlecht's third consecutive final, the best record in the competition, of which they won two.

Qualifying match

|}

First round

|}

First leg

Second leg

Manchester United won 3–1 on aggregate.

Real Betis won 3–2 on aggregate.

Porto won 3–2 on aggregate.

Universitatea Craiova won 8–1 on aggregate.

Notes
Manchester United were banned from playing within  of Old Trafford, following crowd trouble in the first leg.

Second round

|}

First leg

Second leg

Porto won 6–5 on aggregate.

2–2 on aggregate; Dynamo Moscow won on penalties.

Quarter-finals

|}

Semi-finals

|}

Final

See also
1977–78 European Cup
1977–78 UEFA Cup

References

External links
 1977-78 competition at UEFA website
 Cup Winners' Cup results at Rec.Sport.Soccer Statistics Foundation
 Cup Winners Cup Seasons 1977-78–results, protocols
 website Football Archive 1977–78 Cup Winners Cup

3
UEFA Cup Winners' Cup seasons